Frechen-Königsdorf station is a station in the village of Königsdorf in the German state of North Rhine-Westphalia on the Cologne–Aachen high-speed railway.

The station was opened as Königsdorf on 6 September 1841 on a section of the Cologne–Aachen railway that was opened by the Rhenish Railway Company between Cologne and Müngersdorf at the same time. In the late 19th century, it was renamed Großkönigsdorf. In the 1990s, during the upgrading of the Cologne-Aachen line, Deutsche Bahn renamed Großkönigsdorf station as Frechen-Königsdorf. Since the upgrading of the line to four tracks in 2002, the station has only been served by S-Bahn services.

The station is served by Rhine-Ruhr S-Bahn line S13 between Sindorf or Düren and Troisdorf and line S19 between Düren and Hennef (Sieg), Blankenberg (Sieg), Herchen or Au (Sieg). Together these lines provide a service every 20 minutes on weekdays and every 30 minutes on the weekend. During the peak, line S12 also provides services every 20 minutes between Horrem and Hennef (Sieg).

References

Rhine-Ruhr S-Bahn stations
S12 (Rhine-Ruhr S-Bahn)
S13 (Rhine-Ruhr S-Bahn)
Railway stations in Germany opened in 1841
Buildings and structures in Rhein-Erft-Kreis